Edwin Velez (born June 4, 1958) is an American film, stage and television actor. He is best known for playing Frankie Santana in the final season of the American action and adventure television series The A-Team.

Early life and education 
Velez was born in Manhattan, New York, the son of Puerto Ricans. He graduated from the High School of Art and Design and attended the School of Visual Arts.

Career 
Velez started his career as a stand-up comic. After serving in the Air Force, he moved to Los Angeles, California, where he acted in plays and studied at the Estelle Harman's Actors Workshop. Velez appeared in various stage plays, including the first performance of the play Delirious, for which the cast won the Drama-Logue Award in the category Best Ensemble Performance.

Later in his career, Velez guest-starred in television programs including Hill Street Blues, The Trials of Rosie O'Neill (three episodes), Just Shoot Me!, Walker, Texas Ranger (two episodes), Murder, She Wrote, JAG, Tour of Duty, Cagney & Lacey (two episodes), The Commish, Profiler and Empty Nest. He appeared in films such as Split Decisions, Traffic, Repo Chick, Romero, Repo Man, The Hunted, Most Wanted, Rooftops and White Chicks. 

Velez has starred and co-starred in television programs including Bay City Blues, playing Pepe Garcia, Berrenger's, playing Julio Morales, Charlie & Co., playing Miguel Santana, The A-Team, playing Frankie Santana, Trial and Error, playing John Hernandez, True Blue, playing Officer Frankie Avila and Live Shot, playing Ricardo Sandoval. He also played as Detective Alexander Garcia in the soap opera television series Port Charles and as Malko and Paul Mendez in Days of Our Lives.

Filmography

Film

Television

References

External links 

Rotten Tomatoes profile

1958 births
Living people
People from Manhattan
Male actors from New York (state)
American people of Puerto Rican descent
American male film actors
American male television actors
American male stage actors
American male soap opera actors
20th-century American male actors
21st-century American male actors
School of Visual Arts alumni